Koryaki is a rural locality in the Yelizovsky District of Kamchatka Krai in Far Eastern Russia. In 2010, it had a population of 2,735 people.

References

Rural localities in Kamchatka Krai